"Mercy, Mercy, Mercy" is a jazz song written by Joe Zawinul in 1966 for Cannonball Adderley and which appears on his album Mercy, Mercy, Mercy! Live at "The Club". The song is the title track of the album and became a surprise hit in February 1967.  "Mercy, Mercy, Mercy" went to #2 on the Soul chart and  #11 on the Billboard Hot 100 chart.

Original version
The original version was performed by: Cannonball Adderley (alto saxophone), Nat Adderley (cornet), Joe Zawinul (piano, electric piano), Victor Gaskin (bass) and Roy McCurdy (drums). The theme of the song is performed by Zawinul on a Wurlitzer electric piano previously used by Ray Charles.

Musical analysis
The first part of the theme is played twice and is completely made of notes from the major pentatonic scale of the first degree.

The tune is in the key of B-flat major and has a 20-bar structure with four distinct sections. The chord progression is mainly made of dominant-seventh chords on the first, fourth and fifth degrees, giving the song a bluesy feeling although it does not follow a typical blues progression. The subdominant (IV) chord in the beginning section emphasizes this bluesy feeling. In the second section, the tonic chord alternates with a second-inversion subdominant chord, creating a parallel to the I-IV-V progression (in which the tonic moves to the subdominant).

Buckinghams cover
"Mercy, Mercy, Mercy" has been re-recorded numerous times, most notably by The Buckinghams, who reached #5 in August 1967, adding lyrics to the tune. Musicians on the Buckinghams' version included James Henderson, Lew McCreary and Richard Leith on trombone, Bill Peterson, Bud Childers on trumpet, John Johnson on sax, Lincoln Mayorga on Wurlitzer electric piano, Dennis Budimir on guitar, Carol Kaye on bass, and John Guerin on drums.

Chart performance

Weekly charts

Year-end charts

Other notable versions
Late in 1966, Larry Williams and Johnny Watson recorded the song as a duet.

References

1960s jazz standards
Hard bop jazz standards
1966 songs
1967 singles
The Buckinghams songs
Columbia Records singles
Soul jazz songs